Visitors to Saint Lucia must obtain a visa unless they come from one of the visa exempt countries or countries that can obtain a visa on arrival.

Cruise ship passengers visiting Saint Lucia for one day are exempted from obtaining visas.

This agreement allows all citizens of states that are contracting parties to the Schengen Agreement to stay without a visa for a maximum period of 90 days in any 180-day period.

Nationals of OECS countries and France can enter with a national ID card instead of a passport.

Visa policy map

Visa exemption

Citizens of the following countries and territories can visit Saint Lucia without a visa:

National ID cards from OECS countries and France are accepted instead of passports.

Visa on arrival
Citizens of the following 49(+1) countries and territories can obtain a visa on arrival valid for 6 weeks:

See also

Visa requirements for Saint Lucia citizens

References 

Saint Lucia
Foreign relations of Saint Lucia